Mark Bryant is a retired American soccer defender who played professionally in the American Soccer League.  He currently coaches the Los Medanos College women's team.

Bryant attended Chico State where he played on the men's soccer team from 1976 to 1978.  He was inducted into the school's Athletic Hall of Fame in 2001.  He then turned professional with the Sacramento Gold of the American Soccer League.  In 1981, he moved to the New England Sharks.  In 2004, he became the head coach of the Los Medanos College women's team.

References

People from Antioch, California
Soccer players from California
American soccer coaches
American soccer players
American Soccer League (1933–1983) players
New England Sharks players
Sacramento Gold (1976–1980) players
Living people
Association football defenders
Year of birth missing (living people)